The Hispanic Garden is a garden in St. Augustine, Florida.

History and design 
St. Augustine Historical Restoration and Preservation Commission (later renamed the Historic St. Augustine Preservation Board) bought the plot of land between the Casa del Hidalgo, once a tourism office run by the Spanish Government, and the Pan American Center to build a garden as a symbolic link between the shared Hispanic heritage of Spain, Latin America, and Florida. Commission member Elizabeth Towers established and led the Hispanic Garden Committee in order to raise the $45,000 needed to complete the garden, thus the committee held many fundraising events, including fashion shows, teas, and art auctions. They also sold small items including jewelry, letter openers, key rings, coins, and paper bulls donated by the Spanish Pavilion at the 1964 New York World's Fair. Philanthropist, Great Floridian, and Florida Women's Hall of Fame inductee Jessie Ball duPont donated over $30,000 to the garden project.

Lee Schmoll and Drusilla Gjoerloff, the only two female landscape architects working in Florida at the time, were chosen to design the garden.  The design was inspired by plazoletas, classic Spanish gardens like ones seen at the Alhambra Palace. It was laid out in a trapezoid, measuring 76 by 82 feet. The addition of an arbor on the eastern end gave the garden a more square appearance. The arbor was decorated with Confederate jasmine and Cherokee roses to act as a shaded walkway and rest area. There was no grass in the garden in order to maintain a historically accurate appearance. Plants included in the design were cabbage palms, kumquats, marigolds, yaupon holly, and Burfordi holly. Each of these plants was chosen because it was native to northeast Florida or was introduced by the Spaniard settlers upon their arrival in the 16th century.

Sculptor Anna Hyatt Huntington created and donated a bronze sculpture of Queen Isabella riding a donkey that was placed in the center of the garden on a raised pedestal. A square pool was placed underneath the statue, and is surrounded by an inlaid pebble mosaic that was inspired by Spanish design.

Quadricentennial and dedication 

The Hispanic Garden Committee sought to have the Hispanic Garden completed by the city's 400th anniversary on September 8, 1965. Although not completed, the garden was officially dedicated on September 5, 1965, to be part of the celebrations. The project was officially completed two years later and was rededicated on May 2, 1967. Attendees included Senator Spessard Holland, Senator George Smathers, Secretary of the Interior Stewart Udall, Ambassador Alfonso Merry del Val, Director General Angel Sagaz, and Governor Haydon Burns.

The project was officially completed and rededicated on May 2, 1967. At that time, the name was changed from Hispanic Garden to Hispanic Plaza, which they felt better represented its function. Archbishop Joseph Hurley and St. Augustine Mayor John D. Bailey attended this dedication ceremony and the Archbishop blessed the garden.

Current use 

Between 2000 and 2003, the bronze statue of Queen Isabella was removed from the Hispanic Garden while an archaeological dig was underway. The dig uncovered American Indian, British, Spanish, and American artifacts. There were talks at this time on building over the garden site. After 2003, a new fence was erected around the garden, addressing previous concerns of vandalism within the space. The city of St. Augustine had not budgeted enough money to complete the upkeep and restoration project of 2003, so the owner of the St. Augustine Alligator Farm Zoological Park, David Drysdale, donated necessary funds. His mother Evelyn Drysdale was a member of part of the 1965 Hispanic Garden Committee. Today, the garden is owned and maintained by the St. Augustine Foundation, Inc. It is closed to the public and is only opened for special city events, such as the St. Augustine Easter Week Festival and knighting ceremonies.

References 

Parks in St. Johns County, Florida
Tourist attractions in St. Augustine, Florida
1965 establishments in Florida